Leucobryaceae is a family of haplolepideous mosses (Dicranidae) in the order Dicranales.

Description
Members of the family grow small to large cushions. Species are characterized by having thick, whitish leaves with a large, expanded costa. It has been suggested that the characteristic pale color exhibited by some species is caused by air bubbles in the leucocysts, and the presence of air in the leaf is assumed characteristic of the Leucobryaceae.

Classification
The Leucobryaceae have been sometimes included in the Dicranaceae because of similar costa and peristome structures. 

The number of genera assigned to the family has been subject to much debate and has ranged from one to fourteen. Some genera previous assigned to Leucobryaceae have been split off into the family Calymperaceae, while molecular analyses have led to other changes, with other genera from Dicranaceae included.

The family currently includes twelve genera:

Atractylocarpus 
Brothera 
Bryohumbertia 
Campylopodiella 
Campylopus 
Cladopodanthus 
Dicranodontium 
Leucobryum 
Microcampylopus 
Ochrobryum 
Pilopogon 
Schistomitrium

References

Dicranales
Moss families